William Henry Peckitt FRPSL (died 7 December 1934) was a British stamp dealer and fellow of the Royal Philatelic Society London. He was known as the "Panther of the Strand" for his acute business sense, acquiring most of the collection of the Earl of Crawford as well as Sir William Avery's collection.

References

Further reading
 "Over £1,000 for One Stamp: Mr. Peckitt pays big money for the penny "Post Office" Mauritius", Stamp Collectors' Fortnightly, 9 July 1898, p. 191.
 "Mr. Peckitt's Thousand-pounder", Stamp Collectors' Fortnightly, 23 July 1898, p. 195.

External links

1934 deaths
British stamp dealers
Year of birth missing
Fellows of the Royal Philatelic Society London